SSION (b. February 19, 1982 in Lewisport, Kentucky) aka Cody Critcheloe is a multifaceted audiovisual artist embodying music, video directing, painting, and live performance. SSION has released several records to date and has collaborated with a range of artists such as  Róisín Murphy, Sky Ferreira, Ariel Pink, and Hood By Air, among others. He has directed music videos for musicians like Robyn, Perfume Genius, Yves Tumor, Santigold, and King Princess, and has exhibited artwork and paintings internationally. SSION is pronounced shun and is used as a moniker for Critcheloe's multimedia practice. He lives and works in Los Angeles, California.

Early life and education 
Ssion was born and raised in Lewisport, Kentucky. His mother was a draftsman and his father worked as a maintenance manager at a paper mill. In high school, Critcheloe formed a punk rock band named SSION.

After high school, he relocated to Kansas City, Missouri for college, where he studied  fine art at the Kansas City Art Institute and graduated with a BFA. At college, he reformed SSION with three visual artists. While in school, he created album artwork for the Yeah Yeah Yeahs's "Fever to Tell" and music videos for the likes of Liars and Peaches along with stop-motion animated videos for SSION’s music.  American musician BloodPop studied under the guidance of Critcheloe and learned how to produce music while they studied at the Kansas City Art Institute.

Music
In 2003, SSION released the EP Minor Treat and the album Opportunity Bless My Soul.

SSION released their second album, Fools Gold, accompanied with a remix EP Clown, in 2008. The album achieved critical success and straddles several genres like disco, house, and electro-punk. SSION's voice has been linked to late-1990s incarnation of Royal Trux's Neil Hagerty and Darby Crash. On Pitchfork, critic Eric Harvey writes: "Ssion's tendency to weave sympathy and encouragement through the naughty bits-- erasing the boring distinctions between partying, sex, music, and boundless, delirious dreaming-- clearly aligns them with CSS, Scissor Sisters, and Junior Senior, their fellow purveyors of devilishly simple, self-reflexive, and undeniably catchy dance-pop."  In 2010, Critcheloe moved to New York where he met a new set of collaborators including Mykki Blanco, Colin Self, Shayne Oliver, Raul de Nieves and Nick Weiss of Teengirl Fantasy and performed at Secret Project Robot and GHE20GOTH1K.

In 2011, SSION self-released the electropop and disco-influenced, Bent, his third album. It was eventually re-released in 2012. The release of the album coincided with a 3-day performance at MoMA PS1 with Sky Ferreira, Mykki Blanco, Colin Self and Casey Spooner.

Ssion's fourth studio album, O, was released in May 2018 after a seven year hiatus. The album was produced by Sam Mehran of  Test Icicles and Nick Weiss of Teengirl Fantasy. The album features cameos from Róisín Murphy, Devendra Banhart, Jennifer Herrema of Royal Trux, Sky Ferreira, Ian Isiah, and Ariel Pink. Contributing writer Cameron Cook at Pitchfork notes: “In 2018, so many new artists are embracing their queer identities and heritage, but Critcheloe has spent about 20 years honing Ssion’s droll, campy, dramatic aesthetic—and that work has paid off in their strongest and most timely album yet. "O" is the sound of the zeitgeist catching up with Ssion, not the other way around.”

Video directing 
Critcheloe is a video director and has directed videos for Kylie Minogue, Robyn, Peaches, Santigold, Perfume Genius, Liars, Grizzly Bear, and CSS among others. His first feature film, Boy, was released in 2009 and funded by Grand Arts, a non-profit arts organization from Kansas City, MO. The film was showcased alongside artwork and installations in tandem with Peres Project in LA and Berlin, The Smart Museum in Chicago, and The Hole Gallery in New York City. Boy is made up of music videos strung together to produce what Critcheloe jokingly calls "the gay punk rock equivalent to Forrest Gump."

In 2020, SSION directed the music video for Yves Tumor's Kerosene! featuring Tumor, Diana Gordon, Bailey Stiles and Chris Greatti in a Cronenberg-inspired drama. Later that year, Critcheloe directed a Versace Christmas advertisement special called All for You starring comedian Jordan Firstman and Donatella Versace.

Critcheloe lists Pedro Almodovar, Andy Kaufman, Bob Fosse, Franco Moschino, Beck, Federico Fellini, Jean-Baptiste Mondino, and Bruce La Bruce as influences.

Visual art and paintings 
Critcheloe has been drawing and painting since childhood. His paintings typically reach for punk and Hollywood entertainment business lowbrow iconography and logomania.

In 2020, SSION exhibited a new series of painting in the exhibition titled Chips, the artist's first painting exhibition since the 2000's. Chips cataloged in storyboard-form painted photographs and stills from both completed and unrealized videos directed by the artist. In addition to the artist's own visuals, he included stills from VHS-era source material like David Cronenberg’s Crash, Pedro Almodóvar’s La Ley Del Deseo, and the American television show Seinfeld. The exhibition included 37 paintings hung salon-style at The Gallery @. Author and critic Natasha Stagg writes that Critcheloe's paintings merge abstraction with melodrama and punk rock, blurring the lines between figurative identity and symbolic idolatry.

Discography

Video productions

Video direction 
2005 – Liars, "There's Always Room on the Broom", music video director
2008 – Tilly and the Wall, "Beat Control", music video director
2009 – Gossip, Music for Men, infomercial director
2010 – Gossip, Men in Love, music video director
2010 – Peaches, "Billionaire", music video director
2011 – Santigold, "Big Mouth", music video director
2011 – MNDR, "#1 in Heaven", music video director
2014 – Dum Dum Girls, "Lost Boys and Girls Club", music video director
2014 – Kylie Minogue, "Sexercize", music video director
2014 – Perfume Genius, "Queen", music video director
2015 – Robyn, "Love is Free", music video director
2015 – Lower Dens, "To Die in L.A.", music video director
2015 – Brooke Candy, "Renegade", music video director
2015 – Mykki Blanco, "No Leash", music video director
2018 – Robyn, "Between the Lines", music video director
2018 – King Princess, "Prophet", music video director
2019 – Allie X, "Fresh Laundry", music video director
2019 – Allie X, "Regulars", music video director
2019 – King Princess, "Ohio", music video director
2020 – Yves Tumor, "Kerosene", music video director
2020 – Versace X Vogue "All for You", music video director
2022 – Yeah Yeah Yeahs featuring Perfume Genius, "Spitting Off the Edge of the World", music video director
2022 – Demi Lovato, "Substance", music video director

Self-directed videos for SSION 
2006 – SSION, "Street Jizz", music video director
2007 – SSION, "ASAP", music video director
2008 – SSION, "Ah Ma", music video director
2008 – SSION, "A Wolves Eye", music video director
2008 – SSION, "Credit in the Straight World", music video director
2008 – SSION, "Warm Glove", music video director
2009 – SSION, Bullshit, music video director
2010 – SSION, "Clown", music video director
2012 – SSION, "My Love Grows in the Dark", music video director
2012 – SSION, "Earthquake", music video director
2012 – SSION, "Feel Good (4-Evr)", music video director
2012 – SSION, "Psy-chic", music video director
2013 – SSION, "Luvvbazaar", music video director
2013 – SSION, "High", music video director
2018 – SSION, "Comeback", director
2018 – SSION, "At Least The Sky Is Blue", director
2018 – SSION, "Heaven is My Thing Again", director
2018 – SSION, "Inherit", director

References

External links
http://mail.misshapes.com/articles/ssion.html

http://www.billboard.com/#/search/The%20Ssion
http://www.charlottestreet.org/initiatives/visual/recipients/cody-critcheloe/
http://www.anyonegirl.com/art/peres-projects-present-ssion-boy-by-cody-critcheloe/
http://www.discogs.com/artist/Ssion

Musical groups established in 1996
Musical groups from Kansas
Dovecote Records artists
Queercore musicians
Indie rock musical groups from California
Videographers
American music video directors
21st-century American painters
American pop musicians
American gay musicians
20th-century American LGBT people
21st-century American LGBT people